Formal Semantics in Moscow (FSiM) is an annual academic conference devoted to the formal semantics and pragmatics of natural language.

See also 

 Lomonosov Moscow State University

Notes and references

Bibliography 

 Partee, Barbara H. (2005). "Report from the First FSIM Workshop: Formal Semantics in Moscow, April 2005".

External links 

 Message 2: Formal Semantics in Moscow 4 — Igor Yanovich's 2008 call for papers for FSiM 4, as published by LINGUIST List

Pragmatics
Semantics